The Cretan derby, also called Heraklion Derby or The Battle of Crete is an association football rivalry between Ergotelis and OFI, the two teams that have represented the city of Heraklion, Crete in the Greek Super League. Although the term "Cretan derby" has been used to describe almost every match-up between football clubs from Crete on any level of the Greek football league system, the OFI-Ergotelis rivalry is the most iconic, since it involves the two most prestigious clubs on the island and its roots can be traced back to the early days of Greek professional football.

History

Social rivalry
Socially, Ergotelis and OFI have always represented different cultures. Ergotelis, being based in Martinengo (inside the city center) primarily represented the Heraklion upper middle class, while OFI, based in the western suburb of Kaminia traditionally attracted supporters from the surrounding working class areas. The two clubs were founded almost simultaneously, as OFI was established in 1925 and Ergotelis merely four years later. For several decades the two clubs were competing head-to-head, intensifying the animosity between their fans whenever the two clubs were about to play against one another. OFI-Ergotelis match-ups during the 60's have been attributed as a "social event" for the city of Heraklion, being the dominant topic of discussion for many days prior as well as many days after the actual games.

The Junta incident
Historically, the events that followed the conclusion of the 1966−67 season of the Greek Second National Division (Beta Ethniki) gave political dimensions to the already strained relations between the two clubs. At that time, both clubs competed in the league, with OFI having finished in 3rd and Ergotelis in 10th place, both safe from relegation status. When the Greek military junta came to power in 1967, a law was passed, that determined that only a single club would have the right to represent each regional city in Greece's professional leagues. Therefore, Ergotelis was forcibly relegated to amateur status. Furthermore, the clubs remaining in the Beta Ethniki (later renamed the Football League) had the right to demand the transfer of any number of players from the relegated clubs. As a result, five of Ergotelis' best considered players at the time (Konstantinos Theodorakis, Dimitrios Papadopoulos, Manolis Stavroulakis, Konstantinos Zouraris and Georgios Skandalakis), were signed by OFI. OFI club officials have also been reported to force these individuals into hiding, in order to thwart any attempts from Ergotelis' side to approach and renew contracts with the players. Tensions between the two clubs rose when a court decision in favor of Ergotelis was overruled by the junta-controlled Hellenic Football Federation, which finally approved OFI's contracts with the players and threatened Ergotelis officials with eviction from their home turf in Martinengo Stadium.

Ergotelis's relegation directly followed an incident in which the club's board of directors allowed renowned left-liberal songwriter and composer Mikis Theodorakis (a key voice against the right-wing government) to perform a concert in Ergotelis' traditional home stadium in Martinengo, on August 6, 1966. In retaliation, the junta 'branded' Ergotelis as an unpatriotic organization, accusing its officials of «deviating from the purposes for which they were elected, turning the club into an instrument servicing political, and sometimes unpatriotic objectives». To this day, Ergotelis fans attribute the club's disappearance from Greek football reality for over three decades to this incident, implying there was preferential treatment of the right-wing government in favor of OFI, who were promoted to Greece's top football division for the first time in Cretan football history merely a year later (1968), despite finishing 2nd in the Beta Ethniki that season. These accusations still remain a topic of various controversies between the fans of the two clubs.

Football rivalry
As any regional Greek football rivalry, the OFI-Ergotelis Cretan derby traditionally stands as a rivalry between the two most successful football clubs representing the city of Heraklion in the Greek professional football leagues. Even before their professional debuts, the two teams would often clash for the title in Crete's regional football leagues, as well as the honor of being Crete's most successful club in the Greek Cup. However, following the events that led to Ergotelis' relegation to amateur status in 1967, the two clubs went on in completely opposite ways. Today, OFI is considered the most successful club on the island, being the first to earn promotion to Greece's top professional football league, merely a year after Ergotelis was dismantled by the junta, and once again in 1976 which started a notable 33-year run in the competition. Being the sole representative of Crete in the top-level football competition in Greece for almost 30 years, OFI attracted a lot of support over the years across the whole island, and is currently considered the most popular football club in Crete. Further adding to the club's prestige, OFI have reached the Greek football Cup final twice, actually winning the trophy in 1987, which marks the first, and to this day only major honor won by a Cretan club in Greek football history. Additionally, they placed second in the 1985–86 Alpha Ethniki season, which marks the best finish of a Cretan club in the competition, as well as being the only club on the island to boast a string of relatively successful European campaigns and a Balkans Cup trophy win in 1989.

In contrast, Ergotelis languished in the lower regional and national competitions for 32 years, before making an explosive comeback in the early 2000s and earning their first ever promotion to the Super League in 2004. Making the most of OFI's decline during the 2000s, Ergotelis quickly established itself as the second most successful club in Heraklion, winning the 2nd National Division title in 2006, and starting its own consecutive top-flight run alongside their weakening rival. Ergotelis actually out-performed OFI in the competition during 2008−11, in which for the first time in their history the two clubs played at different levels in the Greek football league system, in which Ergotelis was the sole representative of Heraklion in the Greek Super League. In recent years however, both clubs went bankrupt, and therefore returned to amateur competitions before meeting up once again in the 2017–18 Second National Division, the first time in the competition since their controversial season in 1966−67.

In contrast to other regional Greek football rivalries, the rivalry between OFI and Ergotelis has rarely shown signs of extreme intensity, as the two teams have played numerous friendly games against each other. However the very first game between the two teams, a friendly in 1929, was abandoned after violence between the players broke out, just 35 minutes into the game.

Statistics

Head-to-head

1 Including play-off games

Records
Record Super League win
 Ergotelis
 Home: Ergotelis – OFI 2–0, Pankritio Stadium (23 September 2006)(Melissas 21', Načevski 79')
 Away: OFI – Ergotelis 1–3, Pankritio Stadium (4 February 2007)(Drulić 79' - Haxhi 15', Júnior 20', Budimir 91')
 OFI
 Home: OFI – Ergotelis 5–0, Theodoros Vardinogiannis Stadium ("Yedi Kule") (27 November 2004)(Nwafor 36', 41', 58', Machlas 46', 68')
 Away: Ergotelis – OFI 1–3, Pankritio Stadium (14 December 2008)(Budimir 36' - N'Doye 43', Popović 52', Simić 62')
Bigger grade difference
 Ergotelis
 Point system 3–1–0: +12 (36 vs 24), 2008–09
 OFI
 Point system 3–1–0: +12 (32 vs 20), 2004–05

Matches list

Super League Greece (1959–60 − present)

Football League (Greek Second National Division since 1959–60)

1 Match originally meant to be held 10−02−1963, postponed due to weather conditions.

Greek Cup

• Series won: Ergotelis 4, OFI 8.

Head-to-head ranking in National Competitions

	
• Total: Ergotelis 5 times higher, OFI 58 times higher. 

:1. Contested as Greek FCA Winners' Championship throughout 1960–1962. Contested as Beta Ethniki until 2009−10, when the league was renamed Football League. Contested as Super League 2 as of 2019–20.

:2. Contested under various formats until formally being structured as Gamma Ethniki in 1982. Briefly contested under the name Football League 2 between 2011−13 and as Football League between 2019–21. Contested again as Gamma Ethniki as of 2021–22.

Penalties and red cards
Including all the Alpha Ethniki and Greek Cup games played to date.

Men in both teams

References

External links
Εκεί, εκεί στη Β' Εθνική! Beta Ethniki archives blog

Greece football derbies
Sport in Heraklion